Thomas Tipping may refer to:

 Thomas Tipping (knight) (1614–1693), Parliamentarian during the English Civil War
 Sir Thomas Tipping, 1st Baronet (1653–1718), English baronet and Member of Parliament
 Thomas Tipping (died 1776), MP for Louth (Parliament of Ireland constituency)